David Seth Doggett (January 26, 1810 – October 29, 1880) was an American Bishop of the Methodist Episcopal Church, South, elected in 1866.

Biography

Early life
David Seth Doggett was born on January 26, 1810, in Lancaster County, Virginia. He was descended from the Rev. Benjamin Doggett, a Church of England immigrant to Virginia about 1650, Rector of White Chapel Church in Lancaster County. (Rev. Benjamin Doggett immigrated to Virginia in 1669/70 from England according to most sources.) He had Revolutionary forebearers, and his parents were Methodists. His father was a lawyer. He was educated at the University of Virginia in Charlottesville, Virginia. He began the Law, but changed to the ministry.

Career
He joined the Virginia Annual Conference in 1829, serving as an itinerant minister, traveling through the Southern states. In 1866, he accepted a professorship at Randolph–Macon College.

Death
He died on October 29, 1880.

See also
 List of bishops of the United Methodist Church

References
 Cyclopaedia of Methodism, Matthew Simpson, D.D., LL.D., Ed., (Revised Edition.)  Philadelphia, Louis H. Everts, 1880.
 Leete, Frederick DeLand, Methodist Bishops.  Nashville, The Methodist Publishing House, 1948.

External links

 

1810 births
1880 deaths
American Methodist Episcopal, South bishops
American religion academics
Converts to Methodism from Anglicanism
American theologians
Bishops of the Methodist Episcopal Church, South
University of Virginia alumni
People from Lancaster County, Virginia
Randolph–Macon College faculty
19th-century American clergy